Theruvu Nakshatrangal is a 2012 Malayalam film directed by Jose Maveily and written by Beema Pally A.M. Ali . It stars Tini Tom, Captain Raju, Kaviyoor Ponnamma, Asok Raj and Disney James in major roles.

Plot
Muthukrishan, a street child, escapes from the begging mafia and becomes a district collector.

Cast
Tini Tom
Captain Raju
Kaviyoor Ponnamma
K.J.Yesudas
Disney James

References

2012 films
2010s Malayalam-language films